Lake Bonny, (sometimes spelled Lake Bonnie) is a lake in Polk County, Florida, in the United States. The lake is a part of the Peace River - Saddle Creek Watershed.

Some believe the Bonny Lake derives its name from the bony fish caught in the lake, while others say the lake's name honors a local pioneer with the name Boney. The lake borders the 113 acre Lake Bonny Park, Bonny Shores Mobile Home Park, Southeastern University and the Lake-to-Lake Trail. In 2013, the city of Lakeland opened Lakeland Skatepark, a $1.3 million state-of-the-art skate facility at Lake Bonny Park, which has been used in photo shoots by Nike and other national advertisers. The skate park won the "Build It" award from the American Planning Association's Florida chapter.

Little Lake Bonny
The lake is usually conjoined with Little Lake Bonny on its southeastern corner, except in periods of drought.

Further reading
 Kevin Petrus, Nutrient TMDL For Lake Bonny

References

Lakes of Polk County, Florida
Lakes of Florida